The 2017–18 Santa Clara Broncos women's basketball team represents Santa Clara University in the 2017–18 college basketball season. The Broncos are led by second year head coach Bill Carr. The Broncos are members of the West Coast Conference and play their home games at the Leavey Center. They finished the season 9–21, 5–13 in WCC play to finish in a tie for eighth place. They lost in the first round of the WCC women's tournament to Pepperdine.

Previous season
They finished the season 14–16, 9–9 in WCC play to finish in a tie for fifth place. They lost in the quarterfinals of the WCC women's tournament to Saint Mary's.

Roster

Schedule and results

|-
!colspan=9 style=| Exhibition

|-
!colspan=9 style=| Non-conference regular season

|-
!colspan=9 style=| WCC regular season

|-
!colspan=9 style=| WCC Women's Tournament

See also
 2017–18 Santa Clara Broncos men's basketball team

References

Santa Clara Broncos women's basketball seasons
Santa Clara
Santa Clara
Santa Clara